Gad is an extinct town in Nicholas County, West Virginia, United States. The community was located on McKee's Creek, but was purchased by the US Army Corps of Engineers for the construction of Summersville Lake, which opened on September 3, 1966.

The site of the town is now located under the lake near the marina.

The community most likely was named after the Gadd family.

References

Populated places in Nicholas County, West Virginia
Ghost towns in West Virginia
Destroyed towns